Shades is a 1999 Belgian film directed by Erik Van Looy and written by Van Looy, Paul Breuls and Guy Lee Thys. The story is loosely inspired on the Belgian murderer Freddy Horion and his escape from prison in 1982.

Music for the film was composed by Alex Callier of Belgian band Hooverphonic, who performed the theme of the film.

Cast
Jan Decleir as Freddy Lebecq
Mickey Rourke as Paul Sullivan
Gene Bervoets as Max Vogel
Andrew Howard as Dylan Cole
Matthew Hobbs as himself
Koen De Bouw as Bob

External links 
 
 
 
 

1999 films
1999 drama films
Films directed by Erik Van Looy

Belgian drama films